Jack Kidd (10 February 1908 – 26 February 1960) was a former Australian rules footballer who played with Essendon, Carlton and Fitzroy in the Victorian Football League (VFL).

Kidd was a member of the Moonee Ponds State School teams that won the State Schools Football Championships in 1921 and was best on ground for the Moonee Ponds State School in the 1922 Victorian State Schools Football Championships grand final

Kidd also starred for the Moonee Ponds State School cricket team that won the 1922 State Schools Cricket Championships by making 98 and taking 6/18 in the grand final!

Kidd played VFL Reserves football with Essendon in 1924 and 1925, before making his senior football debut with Essendon in 1926, against North Melbourne in round one.

In May, 1929, Kidd announced his retirement from VFL football, due to a severe knee injury he sustained in a round three match against 
South Melbourne in 1928. He actually returned to play one game with Essendon in 1929, in round three, before coaching the Tungamah Football Club in late 1929

Kidd returned to Essendon in 1930, then played two games with Carlton in 1931, unsure where Kidd played in 1932 and then move onto Fitzroy in 1933 and played one game against Melbourne in round 15 at the MCG and was named their fourth best player.

Kidd played with Oakleigh Football Club from 1934 to 1936 and was their coach in 1935 and 1936, but resigned as coach of the Oakleigh Football Club in May, 1936 due to an injured shoulder and a short while later was cleared to Camberwell Football Club where he played seven games.

Kidd also played 121 first eleven games of Melbourne District Cricket with Essendon Cricket Club between 1925/26 and 1943/44. Kidd was also captain of Essendon CC too.

Notes

External links 

1922 - State Schools Football Champions. Moonee Ponds West State School - team photo
1925 - The Coach & his Colts. J Kidd photo
1922 - State Schools Cricket Championships. J Kidd photo
Jack Kidd's profile at Blueseum

1908 births
1960 deaths
Carlton Football Club players
Essendon Football Club players
Fitzroy Football Club players
Camberwell Football Club players
Australian rules footballers from Victoria (Australia)